is a fictional mecha character that first appeared in the 1974 film Godzilla vs. Mechagodzilla. In its debut appearance, Mechagodzilla is depicted as an extraterrestrial villain that confronts Godzilla. In subsequent iterations, Mechagodzilla is usually depicted as a man-made weapon designed to defend Japan from Godzilla. In all incarnations, the character is portrayed as a robotic doppelgänger with a vast array of weaponry, and along with King Ghidorah, is commonly considered to be an archenemy of Godzilla.

Overview

Development
Mechagodzilla was conceived in 1974 as a more serious villain than its immediate two predecessors, Gigan and Megalon, whose films were considered creative disasters. According to Tomoyuki Tanaka, Mechagodzilla was inspired by both Mechani-Kong from the previous Toho film King Kong Escapes and the robot anime genre, which was popular at the time. Effects director Teruyoshi Nakano also felt that a mechanical monster was cheaper to construct than the mutated animals Godzilla had previously faced. As the resulting Godzilla vs. Mechagodzilla proved to be a greater critical success than previous 1970s Godzilla films, the character was revived in 1975's Terror of Mechagodzilla. The film's screenplay was based on the winning entry of a story-writing competition won by Yukiko Takayama, who continued the darker tone of the previous film by adding the subplot of Mechagodzilla being cybernetically connected to a young woman. Mechagodzilla's design remained largely unchanged from its previous appearance, though it was made to look thinner and more angular, with a darker sheen and an MG2 insignia emblazoned on its upper arms. The film's original draft was going to have Mechagodzilla destroy Tokyo utterly, though the destruction was cut down for budgetary reasons.

Mechagodzilla was brought back in 1993's Godzilla vs. Mechagodzilla II, as the success of Godzilla vs. Mothra and the popularity of its main antagonist Mothra spurred Toho into reintroducing familiar characters rather than inventing new ones. Originally, the new Mechagodzilla was to be named "Berserk", and was envisioned as being a much more organic Godzilla-like creature which would later turn on its creators after becoming infected with a computer virus which makes it self-aware. Berserk would subsequently absorb more and more machinery, to the point of degenerating into a mass of metal and wires, though this concept was rejected early in pre-production. As Mechagodzilla was intended to be a military defense weapon rather than an alien construct, the character was redesigned as looking sleeker and smoother. It was portrayed by suit actor Wataru Fukuda, and consisted of multiple separate elements which were worn like plate armor. Special effects artist Koichi Kawakita originally envisioned Mechagodzilla being able to split into aerial and terrestrial units, though this idea was scrapped in favor of the character merging with the flying battleship Garuda. The film was promoted through the children's program Adventure Godzilla-land, which portrayed Godzilla and Mechagodzilla as rival news anchors reporting on the events of the upcoming movie. Composer Akira Ifukube wrote a theme for Mechagodzilla incorporating a slow battle march with heavy percussion and pentatonic phrasing.

The decision to incorporate Mechagodzilla into the Millennium series was taken by producer Shōgo Tomiyama, who gave the general outline of what would become the story of Godzilla Against Mechagodzilla to Godzilla vs. Megaguirus director Masaaki Tezuka. Tezuka instructed his staff to research both cybernetics and DNA engineering in order to make the character scientifically plausible. Tezuka had initially wanted Mechagodzilla to be a much speedier robot than the one on film, envisioning it as becoming progressively more agile during its fight against Godzilla as the latter tore off its opponent's armaments. This incarnation of Mechagodzilla was deliberately shown being airlifted by carriers rather than flying directly into battle as the previous two incarnations had done, as Tezuka felt that it made little sense for Mechagodzilla to drain its energy in such a manner. Upon being asked why the Mechagodzilla suit wasn't painted with military camouflage colors, Tezuka answered that "Mechagodzilla doesn't need to hide." Tezuka had originally intended to have both Godzilla and Mechagodzilla die at the end of the film, but was forced to change this on the insistence of Toho managers, who felt that such an ending was too dark for a New Year movie release.

In the 2003 sequel Godzilla: Tokyo S.O.S., creature designer Shinichi Wakasa used the same mold to create a redesigned Mechagodzilla, which was meant to look more weathered than its predecessor. According to production designer Shinki Nishikawa, several other changes were made to the Mechagodzilla design's head, chest and arms in order to make the character look less heroic and more machine-like. The robot's back unit was reduced in size and flipped upside down, and the head was made smaller. As the previous design's shoulder cannons were considered uneven and unsophisticated-looking because of their rectangular shape, special effects director Eiichi Asada made them more pentagonal. As the character was supposed to rely more on its forearm cannons than in the previous film, Nishikawa made them larger and more powerful looking.

For Godzilla vs. Kong, Mechagodzilla's design was inspired by the Generation 1 Transformers due to their "simplicity." Director Adam Wingard attempted to avoid the "complex" designs from the Michael Bay Transformers films. Writer Max Borenstein had originally written Mechagodzilla into Godzilla: King of the Monsters. However, director Michael Dougherty scrapped the character during development.

Arsenal

The Showa Mechagodzilla stands  in height and weighs 40,000 metric tons. It is built from "space titanium", and is capable of launching missiles from its fingers, toes and knees, as well as firing Space Beams from its eyes and a Cross Attack Beam from its chest unit. It also possesses rocket boosters on its feet allowing it to fly. Its head can spin 360°, and can form a force field capable of repelling and shocking opponents. The upgraded model featured in Terror of Mechagodzilla included revolving missiles, and was no longer vulnerable to decapitation, as its main computer was housed in an external power source. Once Mechagodzilla's head was removed, the machine was able to continue to fight, possessing a Head Controller capable of firing a concentrated laser with the same strength as its regular beams.

The Heisei Mechagodzilla stands  in height, weighs 150,000 metric tons, and is powered by a nuclear reactor, deriving its energy from heavy hydrogen and helium-3 in pellet form. Its frame is coated in an armor made of synthetic diamond codenamed T-1, allowing the robot to resist and repel Godzilla's atomic breath, as well as absorb its power to energize its Plasma Grenade, an energy weapon housed in its abdomen. Additional armaments include Laser Cannons in its eyes, a Mega Buster ray fired from its mouth, jet propulsors on its back, missiles and shock anchors capable of piercing Godzilla's hide and electrocuting him. The model is later combined with the flying battleship Garuda, thus allowing it to hover and adding two additional Maser Cannons to its arsenal.

The mecha can be remotely recharged from the ground using microwaves that are relayed through a power system on one of the command aircraft, and then beamed back down to the robot. Its armaments include a Twin Maser Cannon in its mouth, railguns on its hands, drill claws, a maser blade on its right hand, reactors in its feet to fly and two rocket launchers on its shoulders. Its most powerful and most energetically costly weapon is the Absolute Zero Cannon housed in its chest, which fires a beam capable of flash freezing enemies. In Godzilla: Tokyo S.O.S., the Absolute Zero Cannon is replaced with a Triple Hyper Maser Cannon.

The Anime Trilogy Mechagodzilla stands 50 meters in height, weighs 30,000 metric tons, and is powered by artificial intelligence and made from nanometal. In the novel: Project Mechagodzilla, its arsenal includes Blade Launcher, Convergent Neutron Cannon, Flight, Hyper Lance, Thermal Energy Buffer Layer, and Tail Blow. When it forms Mechagodzilla city, the defenses include gun cannons, EMP Harpoons, and a force field to protect itself when fired upon.

In Godzilla vs. Kong, Mechagodzilla towers over Godzilla, and is telepathically piloted through a cybernetic neural network developed from King Ghidorah's only surviving brain. Its weaponry includes a proton scream, missiles, jet boosters on its back, plasma punch, rotating buzzsaws in its fingers and drill pliers at the end of its tail.

Film history

Shōwa period (1974–1975)

In Godzilla vs. Mechagodzilla, Mechagodzilla is created as a weapon of destruction by the Black Hole Planet 3 Aliens, also known as the Simians, who intend to conquer Earth before their own homeworld gets destroyed by an expanding black hole. First appearing in a pseudo-flesh outer covering and masquerading as the real Godzilla, Mechagodzilla attacks Japan and overpowers Godzilla's ally Anguirus. Godzilla appears and destroys the pseudo-flesh disguise, forcing Mechagodzilla to reveal itself in full. Their initial battle results in a tie, as Godzilla is severely wounded and Mechagodzilla is forced back into the Simian's base for repair. Mechagodzilla is deployed again but is overpowered through the combined efforts of Godzilla and King Caesar. Godzilla ultimately defeats Mechagodzilla by decapitating it and blowing its body apart.

The Simians return and rebuild Mechagodzilla in Terror of Mechagodzilla. This time, it is further modified with living human brain cells and has its control circuitry integrated into the body of the human woman Katsura Mafune, who is a cyborg courtesy of the aliens, now being led by Mugal. Mechagodzilla is teamed up with the dinosaur Titanosaurus, who is controlled by Katsura's crazed father. Although Mechagodzilla survives another decapitation during a battle against Godzilla, it is once more defeated after Katsura commits suicide, destroying the robot's controls and freezing it long enough for Godzilla to use its atomic heat ray on Mechagodzilla's headless body, causing it to explode.

Heisei period (1993)
In Godzilla vs. Mechagodzilla II, Mechagodzilla is built as an anti-Godzilla weapon by the United Nations Godzilla Countermeasures Center using 23rd-century technology reverse engineered from the remains of Mecha-King Ghidorah. Mechagodzilla overpowers Godzilla in Kyoto, but is rendered harmless by a voltage backsurge caused by Godzilla. Mechagodzilla is recovered and merged with the smaller airship Garuda to form . This combined mecha later fights both Fire Rodan and Godzilla. It proceeds to cripple Godzilla by destroying its secondary brain and mortally wounds Rodan. Rodan then sacrifices its energy to revive Godzilla, who then uses its new red spiral atomic breath to destroy the weakened Super-Mechagodzilla.

In Godzilla vs. SpaceGodzilla, it is revealed that Mechagodzilla's remains were salvaged and used to construct Moguera.

Millennium period (2002–2003)
When a second Godzilla appears in 1999, the Japanese military creates a Mechagodzilla codenamed Kiryu, built around the skeleton of the original Godzilla from 1954. During its first battle with Godzilla four years later in 2003, Kiryu's genetic memories of its 1954 incarnation are awakened, and it proceeds to attack Tokyo, free from the controls of its pilot until its power drains. During its second battle with Godzilla, Kiryu forces Godzilla to retreat after using its Absolute Zero Cannon.

In Godzilla: Tokyo S.O.S., taking place one year later in 2004, Mothra's fairies warn Japan that Kiryu's creation is a violation of the natural order and that Mothra would gladly take the cyborg's place in protecting Japan, should Kiryu be dismantled. The ultimatum is declined, as Kiryu was built partially to defend against a second attack from Mothra herself. Godzilla eventually appears, prompting Mothra and Kiryu to cooperate. Kiryu momentarily is forced to fight Godzilla alone after Mothra is killed, but is later assisted by Mothra's larvae, who encase Godzilla in a cocoon, and Kiryu is given orders to terminate him. However, Kiryu's soul has awakened once again, and it instead grabs hold of Godzilla, flies out to sea, and submerges both Godzilla and itself in the depths of the ocean (though not before ejecting its human occupant to safety).

Reiwa period (2017–2018)
Mechagodzilla appears briefly in Godzilla: Planet of the Monsters, the first film in the anime trilogy. The mecha is designed and constructed by Humans and Bilusaludo - the latter one of two alien races who made contact with humans in an attempt to rescue them - as a countermeasure against Godzilla. But the mech is never activated as Godzilla attacked the construction facility forcing them to abandon it. Though not seen again, the mech is referenced several other times throughout the film. In Godzilla: City on the Edge of Battle, the second film in the trilogy, the remnants of Mechagodzilla's AI rebuild the facility it was created in by utilizing nanometal to help defeat Godzilla, aptly named "Mechagodzilla City". It also creates three battlesuits with flight capabilities called "Vultures". 

Haruo and his forces use the city as a base of operations to destroy Godzilla. When Mechagodzilla City begins assimilating its surroundings and living beings with its nanometal under the command of the Bilusaludo, and is predicted to assimilate the entire planet prompting Haruo to destroy its command center, giving Godzilla the opening to destroy it. In Godzilla: The Planet Eater, some nanometal survives within Yuko's body which Professor Martin extracts and applies to the last Vulture intending to rebuild civilization. Realizing this will only repeat the mistakes that prompted Godzilla's advent, endanger the Houtua and risk the return of Ghidorah, Harou takes Yuko and the last Vulture and flies all three towards Godzilla in a suicide charge to save the Houtua from mankind's mistakes.

MonsterVerse (2021)
Mechagodzilla was featured in the 2021 film Godzilla vs. Kong. Secretly built by Apex Cybernetics as an anti-Titan weapon and modeled after Godzilla, it is remotely piloted by Ren Serizawa via a telepathic link originating from a skull of Ghidorah's left head (acquired after it was torn off by Godzilla in Godzilla: King of the Monsters), though conventional energy sources prove insufficient to power it to full capacity. 

As Mechagodzilla is being built at a facility in Pensacola, Florida, Godzilla senses Ghidorah's presence whenever the mecha activates, which causes him to search for and eventually attack the facility. Due to the secrecy of the project, the public misinterprets this as Godzilla having gone rogue, resulting in Monarch and Apex taking Kong to the Hollow Earth in search of an energy source to confront Godzilla with; simultaneously, Apex covertly plans to use it to power Mechagodzilla, now housed within Victoria Peak. Godzilla and Kong clash en route to the Hollow Earth in the Tasman Sea, but ultimately the team finds and retrieves the power source, in the form of "Hollow Earth Energy".

After Godzilla and Kong fight a second time in Hong Kong, Serizawa charges the mechanical Titan with the untested Hollow Earth's energies, upon pressure from Apex Cybernetics' CEO Walter Simmons. However, the process unexpectedly allows Ghidorah's mind to possess Mechagodzilla, who then kills both Simmons and Serizawa, goes on a rampage in the city, and faces Godzilla. Tired and wounded from his earlier battle with Kong, Godzilla is easily overwhelmed, and is nearly killed before Kong joins the battle. Kong's axe initially proves ineffective against Mechagodzilla, as its energy was depleted after battling Godzilla. As Mechagodzilla maintains the upper hand, Josh Valentine tampers with its control panel via alcohol spillage, stalling it long enough for Godzilla to supercharge Kong's axe with his atomic breath. Kong then uses his fully powered axe to dismember Mechagodzilla's limbs, and finishes it off by tearing off its head.

In other media
The various incarnations of Mechagodzilla have appeared in other media associated with the series, such as video games, television shows, and comics.

In video games
The Shōwa Mechagodzilla appears in the video games Godzilla: Monster of Monsters for the Nintendo Entertainment System, Godzilla for the Game Boy, Super Godzilla for the Super NES (American release; replaces the Heisei version from the Super Famicom release, since the Heisei incarnation's film had yet to be released in America when the game was released), Godzilla: Battle Legends for TurboGrafx-16, Godzilla Generations for the Dreamcast (erroneously using his Heisei counterpart's sound effects) and Godzilla Generations: Maximum Impact for the Dreamcast and the Wii version of Godzilla: Unleashed.

The Heisei Mechagodzilla appeared in the video games Super Godzilla (Japanese version, replaced by the Showa Mechagodzilla in the English release) and Godzilla: Monster War, both for the Super NES, Godzilla: Domination! for Game Boy Advance, Godzilla: Save the Earth for Xbox and PlayStation 2, Godzilla: Destroy All Monsters Melee for Xbox and the Nintendo GameCube, and the Wii and PlayStation 2 versions of Godzilla: Unleashed.

Kiryu first appeared in the Japanese version of Godzilla: Destroy All Monsters Melee on the Nintendo GameCube. Since the Millennium Mechagodzilla duology would take a few years to reach US stores, it was dropped from the American version of the game but did appear as an exclusive in the Xbox version. Kiryu was next playable in Godzilla: Save the Earth for the Xbox and the PlayStation 2 under the title "Mechagodzilla 3"; this would be Kiryu's first PS2 appearance in the United States. Kiryu also appears in both versions of Godzilla: Unleashed, for the first time under the name "Kiryu" as opposed to its names in the two previous games; "Millennium Mechagodzilla" and "Mechagodzilla 3".

Like the other kaiju in the game, the backstories of all three Mechagodzilla incarnations are altered slightly, to fit the context of the game. The Heisei Mechagodzilla and Kiryu are man-made mecha created by the G.D.F. (Global Defense Force) faction to defend Earth from the Vortaak and their kaiju of the Aliens faction. The original Showa Mechagodzilla was salvaged and rebuilt by the Vortaak to be used in their kaiju force.

In the PlayStation 4 version of Godzilla, 4 incarnations of Mechagodzilla appear, the original Showa Mechagodzilla appears as both Mechagodzilla from Godzilla vs. Mechagodzilla and as Mechagodzilla 2 the rebuilt Mechagodzilla from Terror of Mechagodzilla. The Heisei Mechagodzilla appears in its Super Mechagodzilla form, while Kiryu appears in its rebuilt design from Tokyo S.O.S. In the PS4 version, all 4 Mechagodzilla are playable, the 2 versions of the Showa Mechagodzilla can be played in God of Destruction Mode via the Invade option (which allows the mode to be played using Kaiju other than the Heisei era Godzilla), while Super Mechagodzilla and Kiryu can be played via selecting Defend option (where the player defends humanity as friendly kaiju such as Mothra and various G-Force Mecha). In the PS3 version, only Mechagodzilla 1975, Super Mechagodzilla, and Kiryu appear as bosses and are not playable.

The thirteenth level of City Shrouded in Shadow, a game where players, as civilians, must escape and survive kaiju attacks, mostly mirrors the first encounter between Godzilla and Kiryu in Godzilla Against Mechagodzilla. The protagonists, tied up in the building by Yakuza thugs, witness Godzilla rampage through the game's setting, the fictional Ichi City, and Kiryu is eventually deployed in response. After a short battle where both shoot at each other, Godzilla roars at Kiryu and reminds the spirit within of his past as a Godzilla, causing him to be possessed & go berserk. As Godzilla leaves, Kiryu approaches and fires missiles at the building in which the player is inside. Once the player has reached safety or once 30 seconds have transpired, Kiryu marches through the building, cleaving it in half, heading off into the distance. The newspaper that displays the results after the level reveals that, after 30 minutes of rampaging, Kiryu has run out of power, allowing the government to retrieve the inactive mecha.

Kiryu along with Godzilla, Gigan and Deatoroyah become DLC guest stars in the indie game GigaBash.

Television
While Mechagodzilla did not appear in Godzilla: The Series, a sequel to Godzilla (1998), the first Godzilla was reanimated as a cyborg called Cyber-Godzilla in the Monster Wars trilogy.

A Showa inspired Mechagodzilla appears in the post-credits scene of the anime series Godzilla Singular Point, though the lab's computer screens identify him as Robogodzilla.

In film
Mechagodzilla appears in the 2018 science fiction action film Ready Player One where he is seen battling the Iron Giant and the RX-78-2 Gundam. This time, Mechagodzilla is remodeled and resembles the 1974 Shōwa version, the 2002 Kiryū, and the 2014 Legendary MonsterVerse Godzilla design.

Appearances

Films
 Godzilla vs. Mechagodzilla (1974)
 Terror of Mechagodzilla (1975)
 Godzilla vs. Mechagodzilla II (1993)
 Godzilla Against Mechagodzilla (2002) 
 Godzilla: Tokyo S.O.S. (2003) 
 Godzilla: Planet of the Monsters (2017)
 Ready Player One (2018)
 Godzilla: City on the Edge of Battle (2018)
 Godzilla vs. Kong (2021)

Television
 Godzilla Island (1997–1998)
 Godzilla Singular Point (2021)

Video games
 Godzilla: Monster of Monsters (NES – 1988) – as Mechagodzilla (1974)
 Godzilla / Godzilla-Kun: Kaijuu Daikessen (Game Boy – 1990) – as Mechagodzilla (1974)
 Battle Soccer: Field no Hasha (Super Famicom – 1992) – as Mechagodzilla (1974)
 Super Godzilla (Super NES – 1993) – as Mechagodzilla (1974) and Mechagodzilla 2
 Kaijū-ō Godzilla / King of the Monsters, Godzilla (Game Boy – 1993)
 Godzilla: Battle Legends (Turbo Duo – 1993)
 Godzilla: Monster War / Godzilla: Destroy All Monsters (Super NES – 1994)
 Godzilla Giant Monster March (Game Gear – 1995)
 Godzilla Trading Battle (PlayStation – 1998) – as Mechagodzilla (1974) and Mechagodzilla 2
 Godzilla Generations (Dreamcast – 1998) – as Mechagodzilla (1974)
 Godzilla: Destroy All Monsters Melee (Nintendo GameCube, Xbox – 2002/2003) – as Mechagodzilla 2 and Mechagodzilla 3 (Xbox exclusive)
 Godzilla: Domination! (Game Boy Advance – 2002) – as Mechagodzilla 2 and Mechagodzilla 3
 Godzilla: Save the Earth (Xbox, PlayStation 2 – 2004) – as Mechagodzilla 2 and Mechagodzilla 3
 Godzilla: Unleashed (Wii, PlayStation 2 – 2007) – as Mechagodzilla (1974, Wii exclusive), Mechagodzilla 2 and Kiryu
 Godzilla Unleashed: Double Smash (Nintendo DS – 2007) – as Kiryu
 Godzilla on Monster Island (AVP Slot – 2011) – as Kiryu
 Godzilla (PlayStation 3, PlayStation 4 – 2014/2015) – as Mechagodzilla (1974, PS4 exclusive), Mechagodzilla 2 (1975), Super Mechagodzilla, and Kiryu
 City Shrouded in Shadow (PS4 – 2017) – as Kiryu
 Godzilla Defense Force (2019)
 GigaBash (2022) - as Kiryu

Literature
 Godzilla vs. the Robot Monsters (1998)
 Ready Player One (novel – 2011) – as Kiryu
 Godzilla: Kingdom of Monsters (comic – 2011–2012)
 Godzilla: Gangsters and Goliaths (comic – 2011)
 Godzilla: Legends (comic – 2011–2012)
 Godzilla: Ongoing (comic – 2012)
 Godzilla: The Half-Century War (comic – 2012–2013)
 Godzilla: Rulers of Earth (comic – 2013–2015) – as Mechagodzilla (1974) and Kiryu
 Godzilla: Oblivion (comic – 2016)
 Godzilla: Monster Apocalypse (novel – 2017)
 Godzilla: Project Mechagodzilla (novel – 2018)

Reception
The character has generally been positively received. It was rated No. 15 of the 50 Best Movie Robots by The Times, beating other such legends as C-3PO from Star Wars, the T-1000 from Terminator 2: Judgment Day, and Optimus Prime from Transformers. Complex listed the character as No. 6 on its "The 15 Most Badass Kaiju Monsters of All Time" list, while IGN listed it as No. 4 on their "Top 10 Japanese Movie Monsters" list.

In popular culture

 In an episode of 30 Rock'''s fifth season, "Chain Reaction of Mental Anguish", Kiryu appears as one of the characters in a theme restaurant.
 In Ernest Cline's novel Ready Player One and its film adaptation, the main antagonist Nolan Sorrento controls a full-size Mechagodzilla replica during the climactic battle in a virtual reality environment. In the book, it is the Kiryu model that fights against Ultraman. 
 The film version is an original design based on Legendary's Godzilla design that battles the Iron Giant and the RX-78-2 Gundam.
 In the game Bulletstorm, there is a level where the player controls a mechanical version of a Hekaton (which is the game's equivalent to Godzilla) as well as the song being played during this part of the game being called "Mecha-dzilla."
 Mechagodzilla makes a cameo appearance in the Ugly Americans episode "Kong of Queens", in which King Kong fights Godzilla (King Kong's children watching the movie King Kong vs. Godzilla), and another when Kong punches a wall (after an argument with Mark Lily on the phone), the Showa-era Mechagodzilla was seen having breakfast.
 Mechagodzilla was parodied by the series South Park in their episode "Mecha-Streisand", which features singer Barbra Streisand becoming a gigantic mechanical monster.
 The Nitrome flash game Rubble Trouble Tokyo'' has Mechagodzilla (here called "Mecha Saur") as a tool that can be used to demolish buildings.
 A parody of Mechagodzilla appears in The Adventures of Mini-Goddess anime series' episode "Gabira - The Strike Back".
An episode of the pop culture video podcast Death Battle pitted the Kiryu MechaGodzilla against the DragonZord from Mighty Morphin Power Rangers where it was determined that MechaGodzilla would win.

Notes

References

Bibliography
 
 
 

Godzilla characters
Fictional mass murderers
Robot supervillains
Fictional characters with superhuman strength
Fictional robotic dinosaurs
Toho monsters
Science fiction film characters
Fantasy film characters
Film characters introduced in 1974
Kaiju
Fictional monsters
Horror film villains
Fictional giants